"I've Cried My Last Tear for You" is a song written by Chris Waters and Tony King, and recorded by American country music singer Ricky Van Shelton.  It was released in February 1990 as the second single from his album RVS III.  The song became Shelton's seventh number-one single on the Billboard Hot Country Singles & Tracks (now Hot Country Songs) chart.

Chart positions

Year-end charts

References

1990 singles
1988 songs
Ricky Van Shelton songs
Songs written by Chris Waters
Steve Buckingham
Columbia Nashville Records singles